The 1915–16 SK Rapid Wien season was the 18th season in club history.

Squad

Squad and statistics

Squad statistics

Fixtures and results

League

References

1915-16 Rapid Wien Season
Rapid
Austrian football championship-winning seasons